Mas Subramanian, (born 1954), is a solid-state materials scientist at Oregon State University in Corvallis, Oregon. He is a University Distinguished Professor and the Milton Harris Chair of Materials Science in the university's Department of Chemistry. His work in solid-state chemistry on structure-property relationships of inorganic compounds has led to several breakthrough discoveries of novel functional materials, many of which have found usage in various applications. Subramanian has authored 400 research publications and holds 60 patents. His publications have received more than 30,000 citations (h-index: 75).

Early life and education 

Subramanian was born and raised in Chennai, India. Subramanian received his B.S. in chemistry from the University of Madras, in 1975 and received a M.S. in inorganic chemistry from the same university in 1977. Subramanian's master's thesis featured analysis of various minerals and alloy compounds. In 1982 Mas completed his Ph.D. in solid state chemistry on pyrochlore oxides at the Indian Institute of Technology, Madras, India, under the guidance of the late Professor G. V. Subba Rao. The introduction to his thesis is a pyrochlore review that remains his most cited work to date. From 1982 to 1984, he was a NSF Post Doctoral Fellow under the guidance of Abraham Clearfield at Texas A&M University, College Station, Texas.

Scientific career 

In 1984, Subramanian joined the Central R&D department at the DuPont Experimental Station in Wilmington, Delaware.,eventually becoming a DuPont Research Fellow in 2002. He has made numerous contributions to the fields of ceramics, superconductors, dielectrics, catalysis, thermoelectrics, multiferroics, ionic conductors, and organic synthesis. His notable discoveries include: zeolites as precursors to electronic ceramics, new Bi and Tl-containing superconductors, catalysts for Fischer-Tropsch synthesis, and hydrofluorocarbons (HFCs), colossal dielectrics (CCTO), colossal magnetoresistance (GMR) oxides, and skutterudite thermoelectrics. His work on fluoroaromatic synthesis is one of his most notable achievements.

In 2006, Subramanian joined Oregon State University as the Milton Harris Chair Professor of Materials Science, where his research is dedicated to the design and synthesis of novel functional materials for emerging applications in energy, environment, and electronics. He and his team, at Oregon State University, work on various topics such as pigments, thermoelectrics, high-temperature superconductivity, magnetoresistivity, solid fast ion conductors, high-K dielectrics, and topological insulators. In 2009, his team discovered a novel durable blue pigment, YInMn Blue, the first discovery of a new blue pigment since cobalt was discovered in 1802.  Subramanian has given numerous public lectures all over the world on YInMn Blue, including TEDxSalem and TEDxUNC. This discovery has been featured in various international media outlets (such as The New York Times, TIME, National Geographic, Smithsonian, Bloomberg Businessweek, and WBUR), and has attracted global attention from corporations and museums, like Nike, Crayola, and the Harvard Art Museum. In June 2021, Subramanian provided YInMn Blue to Sir Martyn Poliakoff for use in the Periodic Videos educational web series.

Subramanian has served as a member of the editorial board for the Journal of Materials Chemistry (1995-2001), Chemistry of Materials (2000-2006), Materials Research Bulletin (2006–present), and the Journal of Solid State Chemistry (2009–present), and is continues to serve as an editor for two international academic journals, Solid State Sciences, and Progress in Solid State Chemistry.

Honors and awards
University Distinguished Professor, Oregon State University, 2019
Perkin Medal (awarded in exceptional circumstances) from the Society of Dyers and Colourists, 2019
Elected Fellow, The American Association for the Advancement of Science (AAAS), 2018
Distinguished Alumnus Award, IIT Madras, 2018
Oregon Academy of Science Outstanding Oregon Scientist, 2016
F.A. Gilfillan Memorial Award for Distinguished Scholarship in Science (OSU), 2013
National Science Foundation (NSF) Creativity Award, 2012
Chemical Research Society of India (CRSI) Medal, 2012
Gordon Research Conference (GRC) Hall of Fame, 2011
Chair of the Gordon Research Conference on Solid State Chemistry, 2010
Ralf Busch Materials Science Award, OSU (2007)
Chair of Excellence, CRISMAT, Caen, France, (2006-2008)
Signature Faculty Fellow, Oregon Nanoscience and Microtechnologies Institute (ONAMI), 2006–present
DuPont Charles Pedersen Medal Award for Excellence in Scientific and Technical Achievement, 2004

References

External links
Mas Subramanian Oral History Interview

Living people
Oregon State University faculty
University of Madras alumni
IIT Madras alumni
20th-century Indian chemists
1950s births